IVR is a three-letter abbreviation that may refer to:
 Accelerated idioventricular rhythm
 Interactive voice response
 International Association for Philosophy of Law and Social Philosophy
 Interventional radiology
 Inter-VSAN Routing
 Immersive virtual reality
 Integrated voltage regulator
 International Vehicle Registration; see List of international license plate codes
 Intramolecular Vibrational Energy Redistribution
 .ivr, a video file format ("Internet Video Recording") used by recent RealPlayer programs
 Inverell Airport, IATA airport code "IVR"